Virginia's 69th House of Delegates district elects one of 100 seats in the Virginia House of Delegates, the lower house of the state's bicameral legislature. District 69 represents part of the city of Richmond and part of Chesterfield County. The seat is currently held by Betsy B. Carr.

District officeholders

References

Virginia House of Delegates districts
Richmond, Virginia